Edward F. "Foxy Ed" Cullerton (1841–1920) was a politician who was a longtime alderman of the Chicago City Council, and also served as a member of the Illinois Senate.

Early life and career
Cullerton was born in Chicago in 1842. Cullerton's family were some of the original settlers of Chicago.

Cullerton was educated in public schools. He dropped out of elementary school to work as a canalboat driver.

Cullerton was a successful saloon (hotel) keeper.

Political career
Cullerton was a Democrat.

In 1871, Cullerton was elected an alderman of the Chicago Common Council for the 7th ward. He had been elected by a large majority. He continued to serve until 1876. Cullerton also simultaneously served as an Illinois State Senator, having been elected to that position in 1872, and assuming it in 1873. In the Illinois Senate he distinguished himself by standing as an opponent to the West Side Park Commissioners' taxation scheme, and also became well-versed in parliamentary procedure.

In 1876, Cullerton was elected an alderman of what, that year, was renamed the Chicago City Council for the 6th ward. In 1888, he was redistricted to the 9th ward, where he served until 1892. During part of this tenure, he was Chairman of the Finance Committee.

In 1898, Cullerton was again elected alderman for the 9th ward. He served until 1900.

In 1901, Cullerton was elected alderman for the 11th ward. He served until his death in 1920. At the time of his death, having served as an alderman for a cumulative 48 years, he was the longest-serving alderman in the history of the Chicago City Council, a record he would continue to hold for many years. Cullerton died in his home on February 1, 1920, at the age of 78.

Cullerton had a reputation for being shrewd and for being quiet, giving birth to his nickname "Foxy Ed". He was despised by proponents of clean government, but well-liked by voters in his own ward.

Legacy
Cullerton Street in Chicago, previously known as 20th Street, was named for him shortly after his death. His residence, at the time of his death, had been on this street.

Family political dynasty
Cullerton began what has become a Cullerton family political dynasty.

For a cumulative period of 112 years, at least one member of the Cullerton family sat on the Chicago City Council. A series of Cullerton's descendants would hold the aldermanship of the 38th ward, including William J. Cullerton, Thomas W. Cullerton, and Timothy Cullerton. Also, family in-law Thomas R. Allen held this seat.

P.J. "Parky" Cullerton was an ally of Richard J. Daley and served as Cook County Assessor. He also served as the 38th ward Democratic committeeman.

Patti Jo "P.J." Cullerton, served as the 38th ward Democratic committeewoman for over 20 years.

John Cullerton (his great-grandnephew) served as president of the Illinois Senate, and Tom Cullerton served as an Illinois state senator as well.

References

Chicago City Council members
Democratic Party Illinois state senators
1841 births
1920 deaths